Marinobacterium maritimum  is a Gram-negative, rod-shaped, aerobic and motile bacterium from the genus of Marinobacterium which has been isolated from sediments from the Arctic. S.I. Paul et al. (2021) isolated, characterized and identified Marinobacterium maritimum from marine sponges of the Saint Martin's Island Area of the Bay of Bengal, Bangladesh.

Biochemical characteristics of Marinobacterium maritimum 
Colony, morphological, physiological, and biochemical characteristics of Marinobacterium maritimum are shown in the Table below.

Note: + = Positive; – =Negative; V =Variable (+/–)

References

External links
Type strain of Marinobacterium maritimum at BacDive -  the Bacterial Diversity Metadatabase

 

Alteromonadales
Bacteria described in 2009